The Amorous Ones is a 1968 Brazilian drama film written and directed by Walter Hugo Khouri. The film was selected as the Brazilian entry for the Best Foreign Language Film at the 41st Academy Awards, but was not accepted as a nominee. The film was also entered into the 1969 Melbourne International Film Festival.

Plot
A young university student lives in a permanent state of perplexity and emotional indecision, which is reflected in all his attitudes and positions taken on life. Of bourgeois fomentation, he lives almost in poverty, living at his friends' house and arranging money for small services and loans obtained from his sister.

Cast
 Paulo José as Marcelo
 Jacqueline Myrna as Marta
 Lilian Lemmertz as Lena
 Anecy Rocha as Ana
 Stênio Garcia
 Newton Prado
 Inês Knaut
 Ana Maria Scavazza
 Flávio Porto
 Abrahão Farc

See also
 List of submissions to the 41st Academy Awards for Best Foreign Language Film
 List of Brazilian submissions for the Academy Award for Best Foreign Language Film

References

External links
 

1968 films
1968 drama films
1960s Portuguese-language films
Brazilian drama films
Films directed by Walter Hugo Khouri